Tai Po Tau (historically ) is an area in Tai Po District, Hong Kong. It was named after a village of the same name. However, the village is now known as Tai Po Tau Tsuen (Tai Po Tau village). The village itself is named after Tai Po.

In the past, Tai Po Tau Tsuen and Tai Po Tau Shui Wai (also known as just 'Shui Wai') was one village. However, the village was divided by the Kowloon–Canton Railway British section (now known as East Rail line) in the 1910s.

Administration
Tai Po Tau is a recognized village under the New Territories Small House Policy. It is one of the villages represented within the Tai Po Rural Committee. For electoral purposes, Tai Po Tau is part of the Old Market & Serenity constituency, which is currently represented by Lau Yung-wai.

History
Tai Po Tau Tsuen was founded by the Tang clan of Lung Yeuk Tau. Tangs of Tai Po Tau and Lung Yeuk Tau co-founded Tai Po Hui which firstly located in modern-day area Tai Po Old Market, near Tai Po Tau.

When the ban on human settlement of coastal areas of the Great Clearance was lifted in 1668, the coastal defense was reinforced. Twenty-one fortified mounds, each manned with an army unit, were created along the border of Xin'an County, and at least five of them were located in present-day Hong Kong. 1) The Tuen Mun Mound, believed to have been built on Castle Peak or Kau Keng Shan, was manned by 50 soldiers. 2) The Kowloon Mound on Lion Rock and 3) the Tai Po Tau Mound northwest of Tai Po Old Market had each 30 soldiers. 4) The Ma Tseuk Leng Mound stood between present-day Sha Tau Kok and Fan Ling and was manned by 50 men. 5) The fifth one at Fat Tong Mun, probably on today's Tin Ha Shan Peninsula, was an observation post manned by 10 soldiers. In 1682, these forces were re-organized and manned by detachments from the Green Standard Army with reduced strength.

At the time of the 1911 census, the population of Tai Po Tau was 112. The number of males was 50.

See also
 King Law Ka Shuk

References

Further reading

External links

 Delineation of area of existing village Tai Po Tau (Tai Po) for election of resident representative (2019 to 2022)
 Antiquities and Monuments Office. Hong Kong Traditional Chinese Architectural Information System. Tai Po Tau Tsuen

Villages in Tai Po District, Hong Kong
Tai Po